This is a list of electoral district results for the 1992 Queensland state election.

Results by electoral district

Albert

Archerfield

Ashgrove

Aspley

Barambah

Barron River

Beaudesert

Brisbane Central

Broadwater

Bulimba

Bundaberg

Bundamba

Burdekin

Burleigh

Burnett

Caboolture

Cairns

Callide

Caloundra

Capalaba

Charters Towers

Chatsworth

Chermside

Clayfield

Cleveland

Cook

Crows Nest

Cunningham

Currumbin

Everton

Ferny Grove

Fitzroy

Gladstone

Greenslopes

Gregory

Gympie

Hervey Bay

Hinchinbrook

Inala

Indooroopilly

Ipswich

Ipswich West

Kallangur

Kedron

Keppel

Kurwongbah

Lockyer

Logan

Lytton

Mackay

Mansfield

Maroochydore

Maryborough

Merrimac

Mirani

By-election 

 This by-election was caused by the resignation of Jim Randell. It was held on 30 April 1994.

Moggill

Mooloolah

Mount Coot-tha

Mount Gravatt

Mount Isa

Mount Ommaney

Mulgrave

Mundingburra

Murrumba

Nerang

Nicklin

Noosa

Nudgee

Redcliffe

Redlands

Rockhampton

Sandgate

South Brisbane

Southport

Springwood

Sunnybank

Surfers Paradise

Tablelands

Thuringowa

Toowoomba North

Toowoomba South

Townsville

Warrego

Warwick

Waterford

Western Downs

Whitsunday

Woodridge

Yeronga

See also 

 1992 Queensland state election
 Members of the Queensland Legislative Assembly, 1989–1992
 Members of the Queensland Legislative Assembly, 1992–1995
 Candidates of the Queensland state election, 1992

References 

Results of Queensland elections